Sphingomonas rubra  is a Gram-negative, rod-shaped, neutrophilic and motile bacteria from the genus of Sphingomonas which has been isolated from wastewater from a leather plant in China.

References

Further reading

External links
Type strain of Sphingomonas rubra at BacDive -  the Bacterial Diversity Metadatabase

rubra
Bacteria described in 2011